Patrick John Ogrin (born February 10, 1958) is a former American football defensive tackle in the National Football League (NFL) for the Washington Redskins.  He also played for the now defunct United States Football League (USFL) Denver Gold in 1983.  He played college football at the University of Wyoming.  He now works as a pharmacist for Walgreens in Alexandria, Louisiana.

External links
 

1958 births
Living people
American football defensive tackles
Washington Redskins players
Denver Gold players
Pittsburgh Gladiators players
Sportspeople from Butte, Montana
Wyoming Cowboys football players
Sportspeople from Wilmington, North Carolina
American pharmacists